Jack of Hearts (Jack Hart) is a fictional superhero appearing in American comic books published by Marvel Comics. The character first appeared in The Deadly Hands of Kung Fu #22 (March 1976), and was created by writer Bill Mantlo and artist Keith Giffen. He starred in his own four-issue mini series and has been a regular character in the Iron Man comics as well as at one point being a regular in The Avengers comic book.

Jack of Hearts, real name Jack Hart, is the son of scientist Philip Hart (creator of "Zero Fluid") and an alien woman from the Contraxian race. As a young man Jack was doused in Zero Fluid and gained super powers but was not in total control of his powers. In an attempt to control his powers, Jack of Hearts built a containment suit that resembled the Jack of Hearts playing card. The lack of control became a recurring theme with Jack of Hearts, including his stint in the Avengers where he had to spend 14 hours a day in a containment room to prevent self-destruction. When his powers became uncontrollable he chose to leave Earth, exploding in space without harming any innocent bystanders.

The return of Jack of Hearts and the explosion that killed Scott Lang was the launching point of the 2004-05 "Avengers Disassembled". The character was resurrected as part of one of the Marvel Zombies mini-series where Zero Energy reforms into Jack of Hearts, bringing the character back to life. The Zombies were later defeated with the help of Jack of Hearts.

Publication history
Jack of Hearts first appeared in the black & white magazine The Deadly Hands of Kung Fu #22 (March 1976), and was created by writer Bill Mantlo and illustrator Keith Giffen. He was presented as an antagonist for the superhero White Tiger but his origin story in the following issue established him as a hero. His debut appearance in a color comic book was in The Incredible Hulk vol. 2 #214 (Aug. 1977) where he fights the Hulk. He later serves a brief stint as an ally and apprentice of Iron Man, becoming a regular cast member of the series during Mantlo's tenure as writer.

Jack has made various guest appearances in several books over the years, including Marvel Two-In-One, The Defenders, Marvel Premiere, (in a solo story meant to launch the character in his own series) ROM, and Marvel Team-Up, (which served as an intro to his 1984 mini-series) among others. He starred in his own self-titled, four issue limited series from Jan. to April 1984.

He was later made a regular in The Avengers by writer Kurt Busiek, who explained, "I first ran into Jack in The Deadly Hands of Kung Fu in an issue drawn by Gil Kane and Rico Rival. That great overcomplicated costume and the energy that Gil put into the storytelling hooked me, and I’ve been a fan ever since".

Fictional character biography

Early life
Jack Hart was born in New Haven, Connecticut. He is the son of Philip Hart, a scientist who created an energy source called "zero fluid", and Marie, an alien humanoid woman of the Contraxian race. After being exposed to a vat of zero fluid, Jack underwent a mutagenic change and gained the ability to project concussive energy from his body. After gaining these powers, Jack began his mission of vengeance against the Corporation that killed his father. This led to Jack fighting other superheroes such as the Sons of the Tiger and the Hulk. He also fought the White Tiger. Eventually, he killed Stryke, his father's killer.

Later, Jack mistakenly fought Iron Man. Being new to super-heroics, he asked Iron Man to take him on as an apprentice, which he did, to show him the ropes. Jack teamed with Iron Man, Nick Fury, Guardsman, Jasper Sitwell, Jean DeWolff, and the Wraith, and battled Midas. Jack was briefly turned to a golden living statue by Midas, and then freed from this golden state by Iron Man and Yellowjacket. Jack then aided Iron Man in fighting the Soviet Super-Soldiers on the moon. Jack aided Iron Man against the Rigellian Commander Arcturus. Jack later went off on his own, and fought Hemlock.

Being a Hero
Later, Jack moved past his mission of blind vengeance and became a true hero, working with various other superheroes such as the Defenders. Jack fought the Thing, who was under mental control of the Machinesmith. Jack Hart was then reunited with a college girlfriend named Marcy Kane (who was also a fellow graduate student of Peter Parker, a.k.a. Spider-Man). Marcy, a scientist, and S.H.I.E.L.D. offered to help find a cure for Jack's dangerous super powers. Jack fought some S.H.I.E.L.D. agents, and his powers were temporarily dampened by Spider-Man. Marcy turned out to be a Contraxian agent sent to Earth to find Jack. It was at this time Jack learned of his half-Contraxian heritage. Marcy took Jack to Contraxia, where he discovered that his powers had become much stronger, and saved the home-world of his mother by reenergizing its dying sun. The Contraxians could not find a solution for Jack's unstable powers, and he left Contraxia to wander outer space in exile.

While wandering space he was captured by the Stranger. He later escaped captivity on the Stranger's planet. Jack fought Quasar during his return to Earth; however, Jack exploded when his containment suit was breached in battle with the Presence. Jack was retrieved from space, revived and mentally controlled by Moondragon, and he attacked Kismet. The damage to his armor led Jack to seek aid from the Silver Surfer, who found an alien armorer on Anvil who designed a new containment suit for Jack. Jack then battled Nebula and Geatar. Shortly after this adventure, Jack fell in love with the alien warrior woman known as Ganymede, though she did not return his feelings.

In an effort to save R-76, an outpost manned by the Rigellians, Jack of Hearts was injured in battle with the Servitors. Jack was rescued by a team of Avengers, and succeeded in convincing the Infinites to restore R-76. Subsequently, Jack and these Avengers were captured, first by the Shi'Ar, and then by the Ruul acting under the orders of the Supreme Intelligence. Jack and the Avengers eventually escaped to Earth and helped reverse a plan to have Earth consumed by Ego the Living Planet.

Jack's return to Earth happened during the period known as the Kang War, and Jack of Hearts was accepted as a member of the Avengers, becoming the fifty-second superhero to join the team, though the traditional welcoming ceremony for new Avengers were deferred given the nature of the crisis they faced. During his tenure, the Avengers teamed-up with the Justice League of America, and fought the Red Skull for unleashing a biological weapon at Mount Rushmore, killing many civilians.

Death
When his power levels began to increase beyond the capacity for his containment suit, Jack of Hearts chose to commit suicide rather than continue living in an isolated containment room for 14 hours a day. Jack took a child murderer who had abducted Cassandra Lang, the daughter of Scott Lang (the second Ant-Man), along with him when he exploded in space. With his uniform destroyed in the blast, the naked body of Jack of Hearts drifted deeper into space.

Avengers Disassembled
At the onset of the "Avengers Disassembled" event, Jack reappeared in uniform as what appeared to be a zombie just long enough to blow himself up, killing Scott Lang and destroying half of the Avengers Mansion. Jack's return was caused by the reality-shifting powers of the Scarlet Witch through methods that have remained ambiguous. Unlike his prior explosion in space, Jack's body was never recovered from the ruins.

Afterlife
During the adventures of Hercules in Hades, Jack can be seen playing slots to win a chance to return to the living. This is not the intended way the afterlife should operate, according to the characters. Jack wins, and excitedly declares that he is next for resurrection.

The Children's Crusade
Iron Lad (the young Kang the Conqueror) transports the Young Avengers and the amnesiac Wanda, no longer the Scarlet Witch, back to the onset of the "Avengers Disassembled" when Jack had been used as a weapon to destroy the Avengers. While there they discovered that he was actually the real Jack of Hearts, summoned by Scarlet Witch. Undead and quite miserable, Jack pleads with Wanda not to go through with her monstrous plan, unaware that he is facing a different Wanda. The pity of this and the horror of seeing Jack blow himself up, shocks Wanda into recovering her memory—and therefore her powers. As an unexpected side effect, the life of Scott Lang is also saved, as the Young Avengers take Scott back to the future with them when they depart, thus saving his life while preserving the timeline as everyone still 'saw' him 'die' in the explosion. Jack's last words before exploding were, "I'm sorry."

Marvel Zombies Supreme and resurrection
Jack Hart returned to life once more in the second issue of the Marvel Zombies Supreme mini-series. While defending scientists at Project Pegasus, (which has been besieged by zombiefied clones of the Squadron Supreme) a team of special operatives led by Jill Harper and the superhero known as Battlestar came across a source of zero-point energy which Harper believed could help them stop the zombies. The zero-point energy unexpectedly reformed itself into corporeal form as Jack, who returned to life wearing his original suit for unexplained reasons. Harper managed to revive Jack, who was temporarily amnesiac and fainting from the stress of becoming human again. Although initially weakened, Jack quickly regained control of his powers and assessed the situation. Using his powers, Jack destroyed the zombies and saved Harper's life after she became infected with the zombie virus. Afterwards, the two shared a romantic kiss.

Jack Hart was absent for some time, but eventually returned to a more public life when he literally crashed into the apartment of Jennifer Walters (She-Hulk), and found that he was now able to eat, drink, and sleep normally for the first time since his accident. As Jack regained his powers, he and Jen became romantically involved, Jack assisting Jen in the Reckoning War conflict as they aided the Fantastic Four.

Powers and abilities
Jack Hart's superhuman powers are as a result of the mutagenic effect of his father's "Zero Fluid", combined with the alien genes from his Contraxian mother. He has superhuman stamina and durability. Jack of Hearts also has the ability to generate "zero energy" within his body and project it as concussive force or intense heat or as a propellant to fly. Jack is sometimes unable to exert complete control over his energies, however. For a short time after restarting Contraxia's sun, he uncontrollably radiated enough heat to melt one of Contraxia's polar ice caps. He can survive unprotected in space. Jack of Hearts's brain has incorporated the artificial intelligence of a computerized device called the Scanalyzer, enabling him to think with the speed of a computer and store and retrieve information with a computer-like capacity and efficiency.

The left half of Jack of Hearts' body has turned purplish-black from direct exposure to "Zero Fluid". Jack of Hearts' left eye has an opaque white membrane covering the entire pupil. These mutations were not solely caused by exposure to the "Zero Fluid", but are actually aspects of his half-Contraxian genetics brought to the fore, as Contraxians naturally have such appearances.

Jack originally wore a suit of armor crafted in medieval Europe. His second suit of armor was designed by Torval, and made from alien materials designed to contain the zero energy his body generates. His original suit of armor was later restored and upgraded by Moondragon after Jack was rescued from space by the Avengers and thus leading to his connection with the team.

Jack is a fair hand-to-hand combatant, has had some S.H.I.E.L.D. combat training, and is a talented poet.

In other media
In the Silver Surfer TV series, Jack of Hearts is seen as part of Nebula's crew.

References

External links
 
 

Avengers (comics) characters
Characters created by Bill Mantlo
Characters created by Keith Giffen
Fictional characters from Connecticut
Fictional extraterrestrial–human hybrids in comics
Marvel Comics extraterrestrial superheroes
Marvel Comics hybrids 
Marvel Comics male superheroes
Marvel Comics martial artists
Marvel Comics mutates
Marvel Comics superheroes